Maryland Heights Township is a township in St. Louis County, Missouri.

References

Townships in Missouri
Townships in St. Louis County, Missouri